Georgios Papazoglou (born ) is a former Greek male volleyball player. He was part of the Greece men's national volleyball team. On club level he played most notably for Olympiacos, A.O Orestiada and Ethnikos Alexandroupolis.

References

External links
 profile at FIVB.org

1973 births
Living people
Greek men's volleyball players
Olympiacos S.C. players
A.C. Orestias players
Place of birth missing (living people)